Ernest Brooks may refer to:

 Ernest Brooks (photographer) (1878–1957), British photographer
 Ernest Brooks (rugby league) (1884–1940), English rugby league footballer
 Ernest H. Brooks, Sr., American photographer, founder of the Brooks Institute